Shanthi Nilayam is a 2011 Indian Tamil-language medical soap opera, which is produced and directed by K. Balachander and starring Rathi, Kuyili, Saakshi Siva, Sairam, Lakshmi Priyaa and  Sangitha. It broadcast on Jaya TV from 17 January 2011 to 9 May 2012.

Synopsis
The story revolves around a well known hospital called Shanthi Nilayam and the doctors working in it. The problems surrounding the personal lives of the doctors and the hardships faced by them at the workplace are portrayed very well with different narration.

Cast

Main
 Rathi
 Kuyili
 Saakshi Siva
 Sairam
 Lakshmi Priyaa

Additional cast

 Sangitha
 Aneesh Ravi
 Ramachandran
 Rajesh Vaidya
 Shanthi Williams
 Priya
 Yuvasri
 Sangeeta
 Shilpa
 Srividhya
 Rajashekhar
 Sathyapriya
  Aishwarya
 G.V.Rao
 R.Thiagarajan

Awards

International broadcasts
The Series was released on 17 January 2011 on Jaya TV. The Show was also broadcast internationally on Channel's international distribution.
 It aired in Sri Lanka, Middle East, Asia (Sri Lanka, Singapore, Vietnam, Malaysia, Mauritius), Australia and New Zealand.
 It is also available via the internet protocol television service, Astro in (Singapore and Malaysia)
 In Canada, the drama aired on Tamil Canadians-oriented channel on ATN Jaya TV after its original Tamil Nadu.

References

External links
 

Jaya TV television series
Tamil-language medical television series
2011 Tamil-language television series debuts
Tamil-language television shows
2010s Tamil-language television series
2012 Tamil-language television series endings